Scott Field may refer to:

People
 Scott Field (politician) (1847–1931), Texas state senator, 1887–1891 and U.S. Representative, 1903–1906
 Scott Field (swimmer), who represented South Africa in 2004 Summer Paralympics
 Martin Scott Field, American bishop

Places
 Scott Field (Oklahoma), an airport in Mangum, Oklahoma, United States (FAA: 2K4)
 The name of the playing field at Davis Wade Stadium, the Mississippi State University football stadium. The stadium was known as Scott Field until 2000.
 Former name of Scott Air Force Base, Illinois
Scott Field Historic District

See also
Scott Fields (born 1955), musician
Scott Fields (American football), American football linebacker
Scott Fielding, city councillor in Winnipeg, Manitoba, Canada
Scott Stadium, Charlottesville, Virginia

Field, Scott